The Southern Railway (SR) gave the designations 6 PUL, 6 CITY and 6 PAN to electric multiple units built to work the routes between London and Brighton, West Worthing and Eastbourne. None of these units survived long enough in British Rail ownership to be allocated a TOPS class number. The 6 PUL units were designated 6 COR until 1935 (the COR designation was later used for 4 COR units).

Prototype cars 11001–11002
Coach numbers 11001 and 11002 were prototype driving motor brake vehicles for the mainline stock that was being developed for the London to Brighton electrification. The first was built by the Birmingham Railway Carriage and Wagon Company (BRCW) and the second by Metropolitan Cammell Carriage and Wagon Company. Both were introduced in October 1931, and ran with three trailers converted from former London and South Western Railway carriages as unit number 2001.

After trials with this unit had been completed the set was disbanded, and the two prototype driving cars were reformed into 6 CITY units 2041 and 2042 respectively. Unit number 2001 was then reused for one of the production 6 PUL units.

Construction
The 6 PUL (6-car Pullman stock, numbers 2001–2020) and 6 CITY (6-car City stock, numbers 2041–2043) units were built in 1932 to provide high quality accommodation on the newly electrified London to Brighton route. Units of both types each included a Pullman composite kitchen car, which were built by Metropolitan Cammell and numbered 256 to 278 in the Pullman Car Company series.

The 6 CITY units differed from the 6 PUL units only in that the three trailers other than the Pullman car had all first class accommodation. They were dedicated for use on the London Bridge to Brighton route (as opposed to the London Victoria route on which the 6 PUL units were used), and were intended for the trains used by City workers, hence their designation.

The 6 PAN (6-car Pantry units, numbers 2021–2037) units were introduced in 1935, upon the extension of the electrified network to Ore. They were similar to the 6 PUL units, except that the Pullman car was replaced by a first class dining car with a pantry. From this time, 12-car trains were often formed from a 6 PAN coupled to either a 6 PUL or 6 CITY.

Until the arrival of the 6 PAN units, the 6 PUL units had been referred to as 6 COR (6-car Corridor stock) and, as explained below, the designation COR was again used by this stock in later years for various reasons. The numbers of all three types of unit were revised in January 1937 from 20xx to 30xx.

Formations
Initial formations of these units were as follows (coaches were not formed in numerical order):

The Pullman cars used in these sets were numbered and named as follows:

Reformations and conversions
Between May 1942 and May 1946, the Pullman cars in these units were withdrawn and stored at the Pullman workshops in Brighton. This was part of the general withdrawal of Pullman and other restaurant and dining cars from railway stock during World War II. During this period, the 6 PUL and 6 CITY stock were referred to as 5 COR. When the Pullman cars were returned to service, not all were inserted into the same units that they had been in before the war. Those that were reformed were:

During 1947 and 1948, the three 6 CITY units were converted to non-standard 6 PUL units by reclassifying their three Trailer First vehicles into a Trailer Third (numbered 10113–10115) and two Trailer Composites (11862–11867).

After the 6 PUL and 6-PAN units were disbanded, many of the carriages continued to run in service together with former 4-RES and 4-COR stock. These reformed units were classified either 4 PUL, 4 COR, 4 COR(N), 6 COR or 6 TC.

6 TC
The 6 TC unit was formed in 1965 to trial push-pull equipment that would allow a diesel locomotive to be operated remotely from the driving cab in the multiple unit. It was 
composed of former 4Cor driving motor cars, which had their motors removed and the end gangways removed, and 6 PAN/6 PUL trailer cars. At the same time a Class 33 locomotive was modified to work with the unit.

From early 1966, the experimental train was used on the Oxted line, and was later transferred to the Clapham Junction to Kensington Olympia service. The trials were successful, and led to the production of the 3 TC and 4 TC units for working the Bournemouth line with Class 33/1 locomotives. However, the 6 TC unit had a short life, and was withdrawn after incurring accident damage.

Accidents and incidents
Three people were killed and 34 were injured.

Five people were killed and 40 were injured.

Preservation
Former 6 PUL Pullman cars 264 Ruth and 278 Bertha have been preserved, and are now used as ordinary locomotive-hauled Pullman cars. Number 264 is part of the Venice Simplon Orient Express fleet, working charter trains on the main line, while 278 is at Carnforth under private ownership.

The underframes of several PUL and PAN unit carriages were reused by the engineering department as long-welded rail carriers and crane runners.

References

Sources

External links 

 Southern Railway E-mail Group - 6 Cit/6 Cor/6 Pan/6 Pul.
 Southern Electric Group - 6-car express units (6 Pul. and 6 Cit).
 Southern Electric Group - 6-car express units (6 Pan).

6PUL
SR 6Pul
Train-related introductions in 1932
Metropolitan Cammell multiple units
750 V DC multiple units